Jaafar Munroe is a striker for North East Stars in Trinidad and Tobago. He has also previously played for ideal SC in Montserrat.

Career
Munroe made history when he scored for Ideal SC in the CFU Club Championship in 2005 against Harbour View FC as he became the first person to score a goal in the competitions for ideal and still remains the only person to score in the competition for ideal. He is also the only montserratian to score in the competition and still holds this record

References

Ideal SC players
Year of birth missing (living people)
Living people
Association football forwards
North East Stars F.C. players
Montserratian footballers
Montserrat international footballers